Bufonaria foliata, common name the frilled frog shell, is a species of sea snail, a marine gastropod mollusk in the family Bursidae, the frog shells.

Description
The length of the shell varies between 30 mm and 115 mm.

Distribution
This marine species occurs in the Indian Ocean off KwaZulu-Natal, South Africa, and Somalia.

References

 Steyn, D.G. & Lussi, M. (1998) Marine Shells of South Africa. An Illustrated Collector’s Guide to Beached Shells. Ekogilde Publishers, Hartebeespoort, South Africa, ii + 264 pp. page(s): 72

External links
 

Bursidae
Gastropods described in 1826